Pauline Peart (born 31 October 1951) is a Jamaican actress and model who rose to prominence from her roles in a large number of films and television series including parts the Carry On and Hammer Horror film series.

Early life
Born in Jamaica, Peart won the title of Miss Jamaica before she moved to England in 1966.

Career
Making her debut as an extra in The Firechasers (1971), Peart's other film roles include Suburban Wives (1972) and Nobody Ordered Love (1972). Her breakthrough role, however, was as a vampire in the Hammer Horror film The Satanic Rites of Dracula (1973) opposite Peter Cushing and Christopher Lee. Following on from this success, Peart starred as Gloria Winch, a beauty contestant, in the comedy film Carry On Girls (1973), starring alongside other contestants played by Valerie Leon, Margaret Nolan, Barbara Windsor and Wendy Richard; other members of the cast included Sid James, Joan Sims and June Whitfield. She then played Arthur Lowe's secretary in Man About the House (1974), the spin-off film of the sitcom of the same name. In between acting work, Peart was a model. Peart's subsequent films included Chandi Sona (1977), Sean Connery's girlfriend in Cuba (1979), The Bunker (1981) and Antony and Cleopatra (1984).

Peart's first television credit was as a girl dancing with Roger Moore in an episode of The Persuaders! in 1971, and she then had roles in series such as Here Come the Double Deckers!, Jason King, The Onedin Line, Thirty Minutes Worth, Return of the Saint and Tom, Dick and Harriet.

Peart made numerous stage appearances including in When the Wife's Away with John Inman and Jack Douglas and Birds of Paradise with Fenella Fielding and Doris Hare.

After giving up acting in the mid-1990s, Peart became a lecturer at the HCT Group, however in more recent times, she has started to appear occasionally at fan conventions in both the UK and the US and has made a return to acting after an almost thirty-year break.

Personal life
Peart is of Jamaican, West Indian, Chinese, Mexican, South American and Israeli heritage.

Peart is good friends with fellow Hammer actresses Caroline Munro and Martine Beswick and the three often appear together at conventions.

Filmography

Film

Television

References

External links

1951 births
Living people
Jamaican actresses
Jamaican beauty pageant winners